ImpressCMS is an open source content management system for building and maintaining dynamic web sites, written in the PHP programming language and using a MySQL database. The product is released under the GNU General Public License version 2.

History
The ImpressCMS Project was formed in late 2007 as a result of a division in the XOOPS community. The first beta release of ImpressCMS was introduced in January 2008 and ImpressCMS 1.0 Final was published in March 2008, establishing its new identity apart from XOOPS and incorporating bug fixes, security enhancements and new features. This was followed by the release of ImpressCMS 1.1 in October 2008.

Version 1.2 was released almost one year later. Major changes were done to the core of the system, hence the longer development time. This version introduced the ImpressCMS Persistable Framework (IPF) in the core, the ‘Content’ core module was transformed into a stand-alone module, and the installation system had a substantial refresh. On the visual side a new theme was introduced, featuring an AJAX redirect for system messages.

Marking the end of a long development period, version 1.3 was released on 20 September 2011. The ImpressCMS 1.3 series is a total refactor of the core system aimed at modernising the code structure, making the system smaller, faster and use less memory. This is also the last branch of ImpressCMS to provide compatibility with previous Xoops-based modules.

Awards
In 2009, ImpressCMS placed first as the Most Promising Open Source CMS in the Packt Publishing awards.

ImpressCMS was the third-place winner of the Packt 2008 Most Promising Open Source CMS award, and a finalist in the 2008 SourceForge Best New Project award category.
 Marc-Andre Lanciault, a founder and lead developer for ImpressCMS, also received recognition on the list of Open Source CMS Most Valued People during the 2008 Packt awards.

Features
ImpressCMS uses an open architecture, allowing webmasters to add modules into the core CMS for additional functionality. Modules exist that have been developed by an international community of developers, designers and fans and are able to handle most every task associated with the managing of web content and an online community.

The basic features of ImpressCMS are:

Database driven
Granular permissions for users and groups
Complete user profiles and private messaging
Customizable themes and templates
Integrated comment system, with moderation options
Integrated management for banner advertising
Site-wide search function
Multibyte language support
PDF generation via TCPDF library

See also

Content management system
Free software
Open source software
List of content management systems

References

External links

Free content management systems